Orange is the fourth studio album by German progressive metal band, Dark Suns. The album largely abandons the band's previous style in order to create a 1970s progressive rock vibe, similar to Opeth's Heritage, which was released the same year as Orange.

Track listing

Personnel
 Niko Knappe – vocals, drums
 Maik Knappe – guitars
 Torsten Wenzel – guitars
 Jacob Muller – bass
 Ekkehard Meister – organ, piano, keyboards

Guests

 Evgeny Ring – alto sax
 Govinda Abbott – trumpet

2011 albums
Dark Suns albums